The 1976 Tipperary Senior Hurling Championship was the 86th staging of the Tipperary Senior Hurling Championship since its establishment by the Tipperary County Board in 1887.

Moneygall were the defending champions.

On 12 September 1976, Moneygall won the championship after a 1-09 to 2-05 defeat of Roscrea in the final at Semple Stadium. It was their second championship title overall and their second title in succession.

Results

Final

Championship statistics

Miscellaneous

 The final of the Tipperary Senior Football Championship was played as the curtain raiser to the hurling final. It was the first time that both county finals were played together on the same day.

References

External links

 1976 County finals programme

Tipperary
Tipperary Senior Hurling Championship